La Bazeuge is a commune in the Haute-Vienne département in the Nouvelle-Aquitaine region in western France.

Inhabitants are known as Bazeugeois.

Geography
The river Brame forms all of the commune's southern border.

People
 La Bazeuge is the birthplace of Saint Théobald (990-1070).

See also
Communes of the Haute-Vienne department

References

Communes of Haute-Vienne